The MKS system of units is a physical system of measurement that uses the metre, kilogram, and second (MKS) as base units. It forms the base of the International System of Units (SI), though SI has since been redefined by different fundamental constants.

History 
By the 19th century, there was a demand by scientists to define a coherent system of units. A coherent system of units is a system of units where all units are directly derived from a set of base units, without the need of any conversion factors. The United States customary units are an example of a non-coherent set of units. In 1874, the British Association for the Advancement of Science (BAAS) introduced the CGS system, a coherent system based on the centimetre, gram and second. These units were inconvenient for electromagnetic applications, since electromagnetic units derived from these did not correspond to the commonly used practical units, such as the volt, ampere and ohm. After the Metre Convention of 1875, work started on international prototypes for the kilogram and the metre, which were formally sanctioned by the General Conference on Weights and Measures (CGPM) in 1889, thus formalizing the MKS system by using the kilogram and metre as base units.

In 1901, Giovanni Giorgi proposed to the Associazione elettrotecnica italiana (AEI) that the MKS system, extended with a fourth unit to be taken from the practical units of electromagnetism, such as the volt, ohm or ampere, be used to create a coherent system using practical units.
This system was strongly promoted by electrical engineer George A. Campbell. The CGS and MKS systems were both widely used in the 20th century, with the MKS system being primarily used in practical areas, such as commerce and engineering. The International Electrotechnical Commission (IEC) adopted Giorgi's proposal as the M.K.S. System of Giorgi in 1935 without specifying which electromagnetic unit would be the fourth base unit. In 1939, the Consultative Committee for Electricity (CCE) recommended the adoption of Giorgi's proposal, using the ampere as the fourth base unit. This was subsequently approved by the CGPM in 1954.  

The rmks system (rationalized metre–kilogram–second) combines MKS with rationalization of electromagnetic equations.

The MKS system with the ampere as a fourth base unit, is sometimes referred to as the MKSA system. This system was extended by adding the kelvin and candela as base units in 1960, thus forming the International System of Units. The mole was added as a seventh base unit in 1971.

Derived units

Mechanical units

Electromagnetic units

See also

 Centimeter–gram–second system (CGS)
 Foot–pound–second system (FPS)
 List of metric units
 Meter–tonne–second system (MTS)
 Vacuum permeability § Systems of units and historical origin of value of μ0

References

External links
Description of the MKS system

Metric system
Systems of units